"One Breath Away" is a pop ballad song by Australian singer Sophie Monk, released as the third single from her debut album, Calendar Girl (2003), on 21 July 2003. The song was re-recorded and mixed for single release. The album version was produced by Garry Miller and Brian Rawling while the single version was produced by the Rockmelons. The single peaked at number 23 on the Australian Singles Chart in August 2003.

Track listing
 "One Breath Away" (radio edit) — 3:41
 "One Breath Away" (Juicy mix) — 7:33
 "Come My Way" (club mix) — 8:09
 "One Breath Away" (Reactor Trance mix) — 3:31
 "One Breath Away" (Hard House mix) — 7:55
 "One Breath Away" (Tracelands remix) — 3:59

Charts

References

External links
 One Breath Away

2003 singles
Song recordings produced by Brian Rawling
Songs written by Mark Taylor (record producer)
Songs written by Paul Barry (songwriter)
Songs written by Steve Torch
Warner Music Group singles